Clem Ohameze is a Nigerian actor with two decades in acting. Clem Ohameze started professional acting in 1995. But his breakthrough role was in 1998 when he featured in a big-budget movie titled ENDTIME. He has acted in over 500 movies in his 20-year career spanning 1995 to date and is set to feature in many more movies in the coming months.

Background
Clem Ohameze was born on 27 June 1965 in Port Harcourt, Rivers, Nigeria. He attended Holy Family College/ Baptist High School for his secondary education. He moved on to study at the Institute of Management Technology, Enugu, Nigeria where he secured an Ordinary National Diploma in Mass Communication and then University of Port Harcourt where he graduated with a BSc in Sociology and Anthropology in 1989.
He also studied at the Buckingham University, London in 2010 and obtained a Masters in Preventive and Social Medicine.

Movie career
Ohameze is a member of the Actors Guild of Nigeria. He briefly broke away from acting between 2006 and 2010 to pursue other interests including politics. He has since returned to his movie career after the break. In 2010, Ohameze starred in the award-winning movie Ije: The Journey alongside Genevieve Nnaji and Omotola Jalade Ekeinde.

Political involvement
Ohameze stood for election to represent Ohaji-Egbema-Oguta Federal Constituency in Nigeria's Federal House of Representatives on the platform of the Peoples Democratic Party (PDP) in 2007. He however abandoned the pursuit over allegations of threat to his life. His car was attacked, his cousin was shot and killed during the incident. Ohameze relocated to London, United Kingdom. He intended to contest for an elective position in the 2015 general elections.

References

External links
 
 

Male actors from Port Harcourt
1965 births
Living people
Nigerian male film actors
University of Port Harcourt alumni
Alumni of the University of Buckingham
Nigerian actor-politicians
20th-century Nigerian male actors
Nigerian male television actors
21st-century Nigerian actors
Igbo actors
Nigerian politicians
People from Rivers State
20th-century births